"Say a Prayer" is a song by English band Breathe, released in the United States during August 1990 as the first single from the album Peace of Mind. The song was Breathe's sixth stateside single, and eleventh overall. In the United Kingdom, "Say a Prayer" was released in October 1990 as the second single from Peace of Mind, following "Say Hello".

The single peaked at No. 21 on the Billboard Hot 100 chart, No. 3 on the Billboard Adult Contemporary chart, No. 6 in Canada and No. 93 on the UK Singles Chart.

Track listings 
UK 7" single (SIREN SRN133)
A. "Say a Prayer" - 3:50
B. "May Lightning Strike" - 4:25

US cassette single (A&M 75021 1519 4)
A. "Say a Prayer" [LP Version] - 3:49
B. "Say a Prayer" [Save My Soul 7"] - 3:57

UK 12" single (SIREN SRNT133)
A1. "Say a Prayer" - 3:50
A2. "Say a Prayer" [Remix] - 3:57
B1. "Say a Prayer" [Save My Soul] - 6:32
B2. "May Lightning Strike" - 4:25

US 12" single (A&M 75021 2337 1)
A1. "Say a Prayer" [Oh Mercy's House Mix]
A2. "Say a Prayer" [Dub]
B1. "Say a Prayer" [Save My Soul Vocal Mix]
B2. "Say a Prayer" [Save My Soul Dub]

US 12" maxi-single 33RPM (A&M 75021 2337 1)
A1. "Say a Prayer" [Save My Soul 12"] - 6:28
A2. "Say a Prayer" [Save My Soul Dub] - 5:45
A3. "Say a Prayer" [LP Version] - 3:49
B1. "Say a Prayer" [Oh Mercy! House 12"] - 6:30
B2. "Say a Prayer" [Oh Mercy! House Dub] - 6:08
B3. "Say a Prayer" [Oh! Mercy! House 7"] - 3:50

UK CD single (SIREN SRNCD 133)
 "Say a Prayer" - 3:50
 "Say a Prayer" [Remix] - 3:57
 "Say a Prayer" [Save My Soul] - 6:32
 "May Lightning Strike" - 4:25 
 Limited edition CD release included a bonus set of three band members portraits housed inside a slim video style box with picture insert. 
All songs written by David Glasper and Marcus Lillington. Published by BMG VM Music Limited.

Personnel

Band 
 David Glasper (vocals)
 Marcus Lillington (guitar, keyboards, programming)
 Ian Spice (drums)

Production 
 Engineer: John Gallen
 Engineer (Assistant): Chris Brown, Simon Van Zwanenberg, Tristan Powell
 Mastered By: Ian Cooper
 Mixed by Julian Mendelsohn
 Mixed By (Assistant): Danton Supple, Steve Fitzmaurice
 Remixing: Daniel Abraham ("Say A Prayer" [Remix], [Save My Soul], [Oh Mercy!])
 A&R: Simon Hicks
 Art Direction, Design: John Warwicker, Vivid I.D.
 Management: Jonny Too Bad, Paul King
 Photography: Martin Brading

Charts

Year-end charts

References

External links 
 
 

1990 songs
1990 singles
Breathe (British band) songs
Song recordings produced by Bob Sargeant
A&M Records singles
Virgin Records singles